A tai-pan (literally "top class"), sometimes spelt taipan, is a foreign-born senior business executive or entrepreneur operating in China or Hong Kong.

History 
In the nineteenth and early twentieth centuries, tai-pans were foreign-born businessmen who headed large Hong trading houses such as Jardine, Matheson & Co., Swire and Dent & Co., amongst others.

The first recorded use of the term in English is in the Canton Register of 28October 1834. Historical variant spellings include taepan (first appearance), typan, and taipan.

The term also refers to the Chinese-Filipino business oligarchs who own or having involvement in various businesses in the Philippines and are the powerful billionaire-founders of Filipino-Chinese business empires. Examples of taipans are the late Henry Sy of SM Investments, Philippine transmission system operator National Grid Corporation of the Philippines vice-chairmen Henry T. Sy Jr. and Robert Coyiuto Jr., and Lucio Tan of Philippine Airlines.

In popular culture
The term gained wide currency outside China after the publication of Somerset Maugham's 1922 short story "The Taipan" and James Clavell's 1966 novel Tai-Pan.

The term was used to describe the protagonist's family in  Empire of the Sun.

Taipans

William Jardine, Jardine Matheson (1843–1845), Hong Kong
James Matheson, Jardine Matheson (1796–1878), Hong Kong
Lawrence Kadoorie, China Light and Power (1899–1993), Hong Kong
Alasdair Morrison, Jardine Matheson (1994–2000), Hong Kong
Simon Murray, Hutchison Whampoa (1984–1994), Hong Kong
Percy Weatherall (born 1957), Jardine Matheson, Hong Kong 
William Keswick (1834–1912), Scotland
Merlin Bingham Swire (born 1973), England
Douglas Lapraik (1818–1869), England
John Johnstone Paterson (1886–1971), Jardine Matheson, Hong Kong
John Charles Bois (1848–1918), Butterfield & Swire, Shanghai

See also 

Canton System, the  single-port trading monopoly operative in China prior to the First Opium War.

References

Cantonese words and phrases
Economy of Hong Kong